Scales is a small village in south Cumbria, England, around 3.5 miles south of the town of Ulverston.

The name Scales comes from the Old Norse skali, with an Old English plural *Scalas, meaning huts.

The village has a long history, proven when mesolithic human remains were discovered in a cave in a limestone outcrop known as Scales Haggs to the east of the village.

A fragment of gravestone was once discovered in Aldingham Church, which bore an inscription to one Goditha of Scales, who it appears was an abbess and was probably the daughter of the local Lord, Michael le Fleming.

The village was once home to a small local primary school called Aldingham Parochial School, which was closed down in 1994 and amalgamated with two other local schools.  The symbol of the three interconnected circles is still clearly visible on the renovated building, now a house.

The village hall, officially called Aldingham Parish Hall is known to locals as The Malt Kiln and would once have been used to dry and ferment locally grown Barley into Malt for use in vinegar, beer and bread making.  Until relatively recently, it was possible to see remnants of the old process in the building but it has since been renovated.

It is in the historic county of Lancashire.

See also

Listed buildings in Aldingham

External links
 Cumbria County History Trust: Aldingham (nb: provisional research only – see Talk page)

Villages in Cumbria
Furness
Aldingham